Cyclophora misella is a moth in the  family Geometridae. It is found in Nigeria.

References

Endemic fauna of Nigeria
Moths described in 1932
Cyclophora (moth)
Lepidoptera of West Africa
Moths of Africa